The 1973 Mississippi State Bulldogs football team represented Mississippi State University as a member of the Southeastern Conference (SEC) during the 1973 NCAA Division I football season. Led by first-year head coach Bob Tyler, Mississippi State compiled an overall record of 4–5–2 with mark of 2–5 in conference play, tying for eighth place in the SEC. The Bulldogs played their home games at Scott Field in Starkville, Mississippi.

Schedule

Game summaries

Vanderbilt

Fullback Wayne Jones broke through Vanderbilt's defense for 117 yards and three scores in Mississippi State's rout of Vanderbilt and gave head coach Bob Tyler his first victory. Jones, a 215-pound senior, opened the scoring before the Commodores took charge with two scores. Jones then capped a 69-yard drive to pull State even. Jones' third touchdown came in the third after what turned out to be Vanderbilt's only score of the half. It was the Bulldogs' biggest win since 1952 versus Auburn.

References

Mississippi State
Mississippi State Bulldogs football seasons
Mississippi State Bulldogs football